Aritz Elustondo Irribarria (born 28 March 1994) is a Spanish professional footballer who plays for Real Sociedad mainly as a right-back but also as a central defender.

Club career
Born in Beasain, Gipuzkoa, Basque Country, Elustondo graduated from Real Sociedad's youth system. On 13 July 2012, he was loaned to Tercera División club SD Beasain, and made his senior debut for the latter.

Elustondo returned to his alma mater in June 2013, and was assigned to the reserves in the Segunda División B. He signed a new contract on 31 January 2014, running until 2016.

On 14 January 2015, Elustondo made his first-team debut, starting in a 2–2 home draw against Villarreal CF in the round of 16 of the Copa del Rey. He first appeared in La Liga three days later, in the 0–1 home loss to Rayo Vallecano.

Elustondo scored his first professional goal on 31 January 2015, but in a 4–1 defeat at Real Madrid. On 3 January of the following year, after being regularly used by new manager Eusebio Sacristán, he agreed to an extension until 2020.

Elustondo remained at Anoeta Stadium in the ensuing years, signing new deals in February 2018 (to June 2022) and August 2020 (to June 2024).

Career statistics

Club

Honours
Real Sociedad
Copa del Rey: 2019–20

References

External links
Real Sociedad official profile

1994 births
Living people
Spanish footballers
Footballers from the Basque Country (autonomous community)
Association football defenders
La Liga players
Segunda División B players
Tercera División players
SD Beasain footballers
Real Sociedad B footballers
Real Sociedad footballers
Spain under-21 international footballers
Basque Country international footballers